Forrest Compton (September 15, 1925 – April 4, 2020) was an American actor, primarily known for playing Mike Karr on the daytime soap opera The Edge of Night.

Early life and education 
Compton was born in 1925 in Reading, Pennsylvania. His father sold aluminum pots and pans and worked at a local steel mill. After high school, Compton fought in the 103rd Infantry Division during World War II. When the war ended, Compton attended Swarthmore College, where he initially studied pre-law and political science but later switched to English. Compton also began acting school theatre productions. After graduating from Swarthmore, Compton earned a Master of Fine Arts degree from the Yale School of Drama, where he befriended Paul Newman.

Career 
Compton was best known for portraying attorney Mike Karr, the central character on the long-running soap opera The Edge of Night, on which he appeared from 1970 to 1984. He also played stern but fair battalion commander Lieutenant Colonel Edward Gray on the 1960s sitcom Gomer Pyle, USMC. He had a recurring role in 1959–1960 in the NBC series The Troubleshooters with Keenan Wynn, Bob Mathias, and Chet Allen. His other television credits include The Twilight Zone, 77 Sunset Strip, My Three Sons, Mayberry RFD, Mannix, Hogan's Heroes, That Girl, Another World, Loving, One Life to Live, As the World Turns and Ed. He also portrayed President Flynn in the 1991 Christopher Walken film McBain.

Personal life 
Compton married Jeanne Sementini on September 28, 1975. His last acting role was in 2002. He retired to Shelter Island, New York, where he died on April 4, 2020, at the age of 94, from COVID-19.

Filmography

See also
List of deaths from the COVID-19 pandemic

References

External links

1925 births
2020 deaths
Actors from Reading, Pennsylvania
Military personnel from Pennsylvania
Swarthmore College alumni
Yale School of Drama alumni
American male film actors
American male soap opera actors
American male television actors
Male actors from Pennsylvania
20th-century American male actors
21st-century American male actors
Deaths from the COVID-19 pandemic in New York (state)
United States Army soldiers
United States Army personnel of World War II